The University of Television and Film Munich (German: Hochschule für Fernsehen und Film München, short: HFF Munich) is a publicly funded film school in Munich, Germany. The school was established in 1966 by decree of the Bavarian government. The University of Television and Film Munich is one of Germany's most reputable film schools with about 350 students enrolled.

Academics 
The teacher to student ratio is about 1:9, the staff to student ratio is approximately 1:4. There are five different degree programs: 
 Department III – Film and Television Drama Directing
 Department IV – Documentary Film and Television Reportage Directing
 Department V – Film Production and Media Economics
 Department VI – Screenplay
 Department VII – Cinematography

The new building of the University of Television and Film Munich was inaugurated in 2011, featuring three cinemas, a VR cinema and four film studios.

Ranking 
The film school has been selected as one of the 15 best film schools worldwide by the entertainment trade magazines Variety and The Hollywood Reporter in 2012, 2014, 2017, 2018, 2019, 2020 and 2021

Notable alumni

 Baran bo Odar
 Maren Ade
 Byambasuren Davaa
 Florian Henckel von Donnersmarck
 Doris Dörrie
 Uli Edel
 Bernd Eichinger
 Roland Emmerich
 Frauke Finsterwalder
 Florian Gallenberger
 Katja von Garnier
 Dominik Graf
 Benjamin Heisenberg
 Oliver Herbrich
 Mika Kaurismäki
 Caroline Link
 Till Schauder (M.A. 1998)
 Hans-Christian Schmid
 Hito Steyerl
 Wim Wenders
 Sönke Wortmann
 Christian Ditter

Academy Awards 
Several HFF alumni have been nominated or have received an Academy Award. Wim Wenders has been nominated for the Academy Award for Best Documentary Feature three times: Buena Vista Social Club in 2000, Pina (film) in 2012 and The Salt of the Earth in 2015. Caroline Link was nominated for the Academy Award for Best Foreign Language Film in 1997 with her film Beyond Silence and won the Academy Award for Nowhere in Africa in 2003.

In 2005 the docudrama The Story of the Weeping Camel was nominated for the Academy Award for The Best Documentary Feature. Florian Henkel von Donnersmarck won the same Academy Award in 2007 with his debut film The Lives of Others.

In 2017, the comedy Toni Erdmann by producer and director Maren Ade was nominated for the Academy Award for The Best Foreign Language Film. In 2018, Ades and her co-producer Janine Jackowski, also a HFF alumna, international co-production A Fantastic Woman won this award.

Florian Gallenberger won the Academy Award for Best Live Action Short with his film Quiero ser (I want to be...) in 2000. HFF students have also been gold winners at the Student Academy Awards in 1994, 2000, 2014 and 2016.

Further reading

External links 
 Hochschule für Fernsehen und Film München

References 

Film schools in Germany
Universities and colleges in Munich
Educational institutions established in 1966
Mass media in Munich
1966 establishments in West Germany